Oberhausen – Wesel III is an electoral constituency (German: Wahlkreis) represented in the Bundestag. It elects one member via first-past-the-post voting. Under the current constituency numbering system, it is designated as constituency 117. It is located in the Ruhr region of North Rhine-Westphalia, comprising the city of Oberhausen and a small part of the Wesel district.

Oberhausen – Wesel III was created for the inaugural 1949 federal election. Since 2021, it has been represented by Dirk Vöpel of the Social Democratic Party (SPD).

Geography
Oberhausen – Wesel III is located in the Ruhr region of North Rhine-Westphalia. As of the 2021 federal election, it comprises the independent city of Oberhausen and the Dinslaken municipality from Wesel district.

History
Oberhausen – Wesel III was created in 1949, then known as Oberhausen. It acquired its current name in the 2002 election. In the 1949 election, it was North Rhine-Westphalia constituency 28 in the numbering system. From 1953 through 1961, it was number 87. From 1965 through 1976, it was number 85. From 1980 through 1998, it was number 86. From 2002 through 2009, it was number 118. Since 2013, it has been number 117.

Originally, the constituency comprised only the city of Oberhausen. In the 2002 election, it acquired the municipality of Dinslaken from Wesel district.

Members
The constituency has been held by the Social Democratic Party (SPD) continuously since 1961. It was first represented by Martin Heix of the Christian Democratic Union (CDU) from 1949 to 1953. In the 1953 election, the CDU supported Centre Party candidate Johannes Brockmann, who became the first and last candidate of his party to win a constituency in the Bundestag. The alliance was dissolved before the 1957 election, and former member Heix regained the constituency for the CDU. He was re-elected in 1961. Luise Albertz of the SPD was elected in 1965 and served a single term. Fellow SPD member Erich Meinike then served until 1983. He was succeeded by Dieter Schanz from 1983 to 1998, followed by Wolfgang Grotthaus from 2002 to 2009. Michael Groschek was representative for a single term from 2009 to 2013. Dirk Vöpel was elected in 2013, and re-elected in 2017 and 2021.

Election results

2021 election

2017 election

2013 election

2009 election

References

Federal electoral districts in North Rhine-Westphalia
1949 establishments in West Germany
Constituencies established in 1949
Oberhausen
Wesel (district)